Davide Cecotti (born 10 April 1973 in Udine) is an Italian professional football player. Cecotti played once for Inter Milan during the 1991–92 Serie A season.

See also
Football in Italy
List of football clubs in Italy

References

1973 births
Living people
Sportspeople from Udine
Italian footballers
Serie A players
Inter Milan players
A.C. Legnano players
Association football goalkeepers
A.S. Pro Gorizia players
Footballers from Friuli Venezia Giulia